Campbells Pocket is a rural locality in the Moreton Bay Region, Queensland, Australia.

Geography

The Caboolture River marks the western boundary.

History 

Environment
The Moreton Bay Regional Council maintains the Charlie Moorhead Reserve as a nature refuge in Campbells Pocket.

References

Suburbs of Moreton Bay Region
Localities in Queensland